The Cork Intermediate A Hurling Championship (known for sponsorship reasons as the Co-Op Superstores Cork Intermediate A Hurling Championship and abbreviated to the Cork IAHC) is an annual hurling competition organised by the Cork County Board of the Gaelic Athletic Association and contested by the second tier intermediate clubs in the county of Cork in Ireland. It is the fourth tier overall in the entire Cork hurling championship system.

The Cork Intermediate Championship was introduced in 1909 as a competition that would bridge the gap between the senior grade and the junior grade. At the time of its creation it was the second tier of Cork hurling.

In its soon-to-be introduced format, the Cork Intermediate A Championship will begin in April. The 12 participating club teams will be drawn into three groups of four teams and play each other in a round-robin system. The three group winners and the three runners-up proceed to the knockout phase that culminates with the final match at Páirc Uí Rinn in October. The winner of the Cork Intermediate Championship, as well as being presented with the Paddy Walsh Cup, will gain automatic promotion to the Cork Premier Intermediate Championship for the following season.

The competition has been won by 58 teams. Ballincollig are the most successful team in the tournament's history, having won it 8 times. Dungourney are the title holders, defeating Cloughduv by 1-16 to 0-13 in the 2022 final.

History
The Cork Intermediate Hurling Championship dates back to 1909, however, in 2003 it was decided to split the grade into Premier Intermediate and ordinary Intermediate. In its inaugural year in 2004, the Premier Intermediate grade was confined to sixteen clubs while the lowest ranked intermediate teams from 2003 were joined by the Junior Championship winners as well as the individual divisional winners - Argideen Rangers, Kanturk, Carrigaline, Blackrock and Watergrasshill. Grenagh, who won the Muskerry division in the junior grade, declined the invitation. In earlier years the winners of both the Premier Intermediate and Intermediate grades would have a play-off to decide which team would represent Cork in the Munster Intermediate Club Hurling Championship. In recent years the provincial place has been reserved for the Premier Intermediate champions.

Format

Current

Development
On 2 April 2019, a majority of 136 club delegates voted to restructure the championship once again. The new format also led to a reduction in the number of participating clubs from 16 to 12.

Overview
Group stage: The 12 club teams are divided into three groups of four. Over the course of the group stage, which features one game in April and two games in August, each team plays once against the others in the group, resulting in each team being guaranteed at least three games. Two points are awarded for a win, one for a draw and zero for a loss. The teams are ranked in the group stage table by points gained, then scoring difference and then their head-to-head record. The top two teams in each group qualify for the knockout stage, with the two best-placed teams receiving byes to the semi-finals.

Quarter-finals: Two lone quarter-finals feature the four lowest-placed team from the group stage. Two teams qualify for the next round.

Semi-finals: The two semi-finals feature four teams. Two teams qualify for the next round.

Final: The two semi-final winners contest the final. The winning team are declared champions and gain automatic promotion to the following year's Cork Premier Intermediate Championship.

2023 Teams

Sponsorship
TSB Bank became the first title sponsor of the championship, serving in that capacity until 2005 when the Evening Echo signed a sponsorship deal. In 2020, Dairygold Co-Op Superstores were unveiled as the new title sponsor of the Cork Intermediate A Championship.

The Cup
The winning team is presented with the Paddy Walsh Cup. Walsh was a native of Castlemartyr and served the club with distinction as a player, coach and administrator.

List of finals

Notes:
 1927 - Cobh objected and were awarded the title.
 1961 - The first match ended in a draw: Glen Rovers 2-3, Castletownroche 0-9.
 1971 - The first match ended in a draw: Nemo Rangers 4-13, Carrigtwohill 8-1.
 1996 - The first match ended in a draw: Newtownshandrum 2-7, Cloyne 1-10.
 2001 - The first match ended in a draw: Killeagh 1-14, Mallow 1-14.
 2002 - The first match ended in a draw: Delaneys 2-9, Carrigtwohill 1-12.
 2005 - The first match ended in a draw: Argideen Rangers 1-8, Nemo Rangers 0-11.
 2010 - The first match ended in a draw: Ballygarvan 2-12, Kilbrittain 1-15.
 2016 - The first match ended in a draw: Fr. O'Neill's 0-16, Kildorrery 1-13.

Roll of Honour

By Division

Records and statistics

Final

Team
Most wins: 8: 
Ballincollig (1912, 1929, 1934, 1935, 1939, 1967, 1999, 2018)
Most consecutive wins: 3:
Glen Rovers (1956, 1957, 1958)
Most appearances in a final: 11:
Mallow (1916, 1917, 1918, 1923, 1955, 1959, 1972, 1979, 1980, 1987, 2001)
Most appearances in a final without ever winning: 4:
Inniscarra (1922, 1925, 1991, 2003)
Most defeats: 8:
Mallow (1916, 1917, 1918, 1955, 1979, 1980, 1987, 2001)

Teams

Gaps
Longest gaps between successive championship titles:
 58 years: Charleville (1957-2015)
 43 years: Nemo Rangers (1928-1971)
 40 years: Carrigtwohill (1909-1949)
 37 years: Bandon (1974-2011)
 36 years: Mallow (1923-1959)
 36 years: Cobh (1927-1963)
 36 years: Ballyhea (1944-1980)
 35 years: Éire Óg (1985-2020)
 32 years: Charleville (1914-1946)
 32 years: Cloughduv (1941-1973)
 30 years: Cloughduv (1911-1941)
 30 years: Passage (1930-1960)

Top scorers

All time

By year

In finals

References

 
2
Intermediate hurling county championships